Odete Lara (born Odete Righi Bertoluzzi; 17 April 1929 – 4 February 2015), was a Brazilian film actress. She appeared in 37 films between 1954 and 1994, including two films shown at the Cannes Film Festival. In 1957 she was awarded with Prêmio Saci.

Filmography

Films

 1956 – O Gato de Madame
 1957 – Absolutamente Certo
 1957 – Arara Vermelha
 1958 – Uma Certa Lucrécia
 1959 – Dona Xepa 
 1959 – Moral em concordata
 1960 – Sábado a la noche, cine 
 1960 – Dona Violante Miranda
 1960 – Duas Histórias
 1960 – Na Garganta do Diabo
 1961 – Esse Rio que Eu Amo
 1961 – Mulheres e Milhões
 1962 – Boca de Ouro 
 1962 – Sete Evas
 1963 – Bonitinha, mas Ordinária
 1963 – Sonhando com Milhões
 1964 – Noite Vazia
 1964 – Pão de Açúcar
 1965 – Mar Corrente
 1967 – As Sete Faces de Um Cafajeste
 1968 – Câncer em Família
 1969 – Copacabana Me Engana
 1969 – O Dragão da Maldade contra o Santo Guerreiro
 1970 – Em Família
 1970 – Os Herdeiros
 1970 – Vida e Glória de Um Canalha
 1971 – Aventuras com Tio Maneco
 1971 – Lúcia McCartney, uma Garota de Programa
 1971 – O Jogo da Vida e da Morte
 1971 – Viver de Morrer
 1972 – Quando o Carnaval Chegar
 1973 – Primeiros Momentos
 1973 – Vai Trabalhar Vagabundo
 1974 – A Estrela Sobe
 1974 – A Rainha Diaba
 1975 – Assim Era a Atlântida
 1978 – O Princípio do Prazer
 1986 – Um Filme 100% Brasileiro
 2001 – Barra 68 – Sem Perder a Ternura

Television
 1965 – Em Busca da Felicidade 
 1970 – As Bruxas 
 1973 – A Volta de Beto Rockfeller
 1991 – O Dono do Mundo 
 1994 – Pátria Minha

References

External links

1929 births
2015 deaths
Brazilian film actresses
Actresses from São Paulo
20th-century Brazilian actresses